U.S. Route 70 (US 70) is a U.S. Highway that spans from Globe, Arizona to Atlantic, North Carolina. In Texas, it has a portion that begins at the New Mexico state line in Farwell and ends at the Oklahoma state line northeast of Oklaunion.

Route description
US 70 enters Texas at Farwell concurrent with US 84, just after US 60 splits off to the northeast in Texico, New Mexico at the state line. The two routes angle southeast to Muleshoe, where they split. US 70 heads due east, meeting US 385 at Springlake, and has an interchange with Interstate 27/US 87 (I-27/US 87) in Plainview. US 70 then arcs toward the south and becomes concurrent with US 62 in Floydada. The two routes head east to Paducah, where US 62 splits off to the north to join with US 83. US 70 then proceeds to Vernon, where it overlaps US 287 and US 183, and has a junction with US 283. Near Oklaunion, US 70 and US 183 split off to the north to cross the Red River into Oklahoma.

History
The route through Texas was cosigned with State Highway 28 (SH 28) before 1939. SH 28' was designated in 1919 as a route from Muleshoe to Olney with a spur, SH 28A, from SH 28 at Crowell east to the Oklahoma border. In 1922, the route split in Benjamin, going south to Sagerton and east to Olney. In 1926, The portion from Crowell to Sagerton became SH 51, while the portion from Benjamin to Olney became SH 24. SH 28 was instead rerouted over SH 28A to end at the Oklahoma border. By 1939, the route was decommissioned in favor of US 70.

Junction list

References

 Texas
Transportation in Parmer County, Texas
Transportation in Bailey County, Texas
Transportation in Lamb County, Texas
Transportation in Hale County, Texas
Transportation in Floyd County, Texas
Transportation in Motley County, Texas
Transportation in Cottle County, Texas
Transportation in Foard County, Texas
Transportation in Wilbarger County, Texas
70